A list of films produced in Pakistan in 1985:

1985

See also
1985 in Pakistan

External links
 Search Pakistani film - IMDB.com

1985
Lists of 1985 films by country or language
Films